São Mateus is Portuguese for Saint Matthew, and may refer to one of the following places:

Brazil
São Mateus, Espírito Santo, a municipality and a city in the state of Espírito Santo
São Mateus, Juiz de Fora, Minas Gerais, a barrio in the city of Juiz de Fora, Minas Gerais
São Mateus, São João de Meriti, Rio de Janeiro, a barrio in the city of São João de Meriti, Rio de Janeiro
Subprefecture of São Mateus, São Paulo
São Mateus (district of São Paulo)
São Mateus do Maranhão, a municipality in the state of Maranhão
São Mateus do Sul, a municipality in the state of Paraná
Roman Catholic Diocese of São Mateus, based in São Mateus, Espírito Santo

Portugal
São Mateus (Madalena), a civil parish in the municipality of Madalena, Pico, Azores
São Mateus da Calheta, a civil parish in the municipality of  Angra do Heroísmo, Terceira, Azores
São Mateus, the alternative name for the civil parish of Urzelina, in the municipality of Velas, São Jorge, Azores

See also
San Mateo (disambiguation)
Sant Mateu (disambiguation)
Saint-Mathieu (disambiguation)